Marcus Leyrer (13 April 1929 – 22 February 2017) was an Austrian fencer. He competed in the individual and team épée events at the 1964 Summer Olympics.

References

1929 births
2017 deaths
Austrian male fencers
Austrian épée fencers
Olympic fencers of Austria
Fencers at the 1964 Summer Olympics